Adiri ( Adrī) is a town in the Wadi al Shatii district in  Libya. The city has a population of 4,611 people (as of 2010).

References 

Populated places in Wadi al Shatii District